The Roman Catholic Diocese of Burlington is a diocese of the Roman Catholic Church in the New England region of the United States, comprising the entire state of Vermont. The Diocese of Burlington was canonically erected on July 29, 1853 by Pope Pius IX. Its territories were taken from the former Diocese of Boston. The Burlington See is a suffragan diocese of the Archdiocese of Boston. Bishop Christopher J. Coyne has been the diocesan bishop since 2015. The cathedral church is Saint Joseph's in Burlington.

History

1784 to 1850
The northern region of Vermont was largely settled by Catholic French Canadians who migrated south from the British colonial Province of Quebec.  On November 26, 1784, Pope Pius VI erected the Prefecture Apostolic of the United States, which included the area of what was then the Vermont Republic.  On November 6, 1789, the Vatican placed Vermont under what was then the Diocese of Baltimore.

During the late 18th century, out of convenience, the bishops of Quebec continued to minister to Catholic settlers and Native Americans, mainly in northern Vermont. In 1801, Bishop John Carroll of the Diocese of Baltimore formally accepted the offer of Bishop Pierre Denault of the Diocese of Quebec to care for French-speaking Catholics in what was now the state of Vermont. Pope Pius VII erected the Diocese of Boston on April 8, 1808, transferring control of Vermont from the Quebec bishops to the new American diocese.

In the early 19th century, there were no Catholic priests residing in Vermont. Father Matignon of the Diocese of Boston visited Burlington, Vermont, in 1815 and counted about 100 Catholic Canadians living there.  Around 1818, Reverend Migneault from Chambly, Quebec came to Vermont and ministered to the settlers by Lake Champlain for several years. Bishop Jean-Louis de Cheverus, the first Bishop of Boston, later appointed Migneault as vicar-general of that part of the diocese.  He continued as vicar general until 1853. Father Joseph Fenwick from the Diocese of Boston visited Windsor, Vermont, in 1826. Father Fitton of the Archdioce of Boston made a short visit to Burlington in 1829.

In 1830, now Bishop Fenwick of the Diocese of Boston sent Reverend Jeremiah O'Callaghan to Vermont to serve as its first resident priest. He visited successively Wallingford, Pittsford, and Vergennes, then settled in  Burlington. Fenwick made his first visit to Vermont as bishop in 1830. In 1832, Father O'Callaghan erected in Burlington the first Vermonth chuch of the 19th century. It was consecrated by Fenwick that same year.

In 1837, Reverend  John Daley was sent by the Diocese of Boston to southern Vermont. He is described as an "eccentric, but very learned man".  He usually made his headquarters at Rutland or Middlebury, Vermont, but spent most of his time traveling the state as a missionary.  Daley went wherever Catholics lived without any particular schedule. Daley ministered in Vermont until 1854 and died in New York in 1870. An 1843 census showed the Catholic population of Vermont to be 4,940. As immigration from Europe and particularly Ireland to the United States increaed at this time, the Catholic population in Vermont Catholic population also rose.

1850 to 1880 
On July 19, 1850, Pope Pius IX elevated the Diocese of New York to a metropolitan archdiocese, assigning the Diocese of Boston, with its Vermont parishes, as a suffragan see.

In 1852, at a meeting of the bishops of the Ecclesiastic Province of New York, the bishops decided that Vermont should have its own diocese.  They made this proposal to the Vatican, with Burlington to be the see city. Bishop John Fitzpatrick of the Diocese of Boston recommended Louis de Goesbriand, vicar-general of the Diocese of Cleveland, as the first bishop of Bulington.

On July 29, 1853, Pope Pius IX erected the Diocese of Burlington, taking Vermont from the Diocese of Boston.  He designated the new diocese as a suffragan of the Archdiocese of New York, and appointed De Goesbriand as bishop. He was consecrated in New York City by the apostolic delegate to the United State, Archbishop Gaetano Bedini, on October 30, 1853.

On November 5, 1853, De Goesbriand arrived at Burlington. He was installed there the following day by Bishop Fitzpatrick.  After his installation, De Goesbriand visited the entire diocese. He found about 20,000 Catholics scattered throughout Vermont. In 1855, he visited France and Ireland to recruit more priests for the diocese, bringing back several volunteers. .

The first diocesan synod was held at Burlington on October 4, 1855. De Goesbriand appointed Reverend Thomas Lynch as vicar-general of the diocese in 1858. De Goesbriand started construction of the gothic Cathedral of the Immaculate Conception in 1861.

On February 12, 1875, Pope Pius IX elevated the Diocese of Boston to a metropolitan archdiocese and transferred the Diocese of Burlington from the Archdiocese of New York to the new archdiocese.

In the 1870s, De Goesbriand bought a  parcel of land on North Avenue in Burlington from a former editor of the Burlington Free Press. In 1878, under the supervision of future Bishop John Michaud, the diocese constructed the St. Joseph orphanage there.

1880 to 1950 
By 1881, DeGoesbriand had a dozen priests to serve 6,000 congregants scattered throughout Vermont. In 1891, the diocese had the highest ratio of French speaking priests to francophone parishioners (1:1610) in New England. De Goesbriand served as bishop of Burlington for 38 years. In 1892, due to his age and failing health, he requested the appointment of a coadjutor bishop by the Vatican to assist. Pope Leo XIII appointed Michaud, then pastor of a parish of Bennington, Vermont, to this post. Handing many of his responsilities to Michaud, De Goesbriand retired to St. Joseph's orphanage. When De Goesbriand died on November 3, 1899, Michaud automatically succeed him as bishop of Burlinton. De Goesbriand  spent his entire family fortune constructing churches and orphanages in the diocese and assisting the poor; he died with only four dollars left to his name.

Michaud completed and dedicated the Cathedral of the Immaculate Conception on December 8, 1867.  He built the Fanny Allen Hospital in Colchester, Vermont and staffed it with nuns from the Religious Hospitalers of St. Joseph. The Sisters of Charity from Providence, Rhode Island, operated another new hospital in St. Johnsbury, Vermont. The Loretto Home for the Aged in Rutland was served by the Sisters of St. Joseph. In 1904, Michaud invited the male Society of Saint Edmund to establish Saint Michael's College at Winooski Park, Vermont. In 1905, the Daughters of Charity of the Sacred Heart of Jesus came to Newport, Vermont, to open a mission, where they served as teachers, nurses and catechists. During his tenure, Michaud expanded the number of churches in Vermont from 72 to 94. The diocese had 75,000 Catholics, 102 priests, 286 religious sisters, and 20 parochial schools serving about 7,000 students.

Michaud died on December 22, 1908. In 1910, Pope Pius X appointed Reverend Joseph Rice, then pastor of St. Peter's Parish in  Northbridge, Massachusetts, as the new bishop of Burlington. Rice was consecrated on April 14, 1910. Rice placed De Goesbriand Memorial Hospital in Burlington under the care of the Religious Hospitallers of St. Joseph, and opened three high schools and Trinity College in Burlington. In November 1925, during a period of anti-Catholic agitation throughout the United States, the Ku Klux Klan burned a cross on the steps of St. Augustine's Church at Montpelier, Vermont.

After Rice's death in 1938, Pope Pius XI appointed Reverend Matthew Brady from the Diocese of Hartford as his replacement.   Brady erected 12 new parishes in Fairfax, Gilman, North Troy, Orleans, and South Burlington, all in Vermont. When Brady was appointed bishop of the Diocese of Manchester by Pope Pius XII in 1944, the next bishop was Reverend Edward Ryan from the Archdiocese of Boston.  In 1945, Ryan purchased a  pacel adjacent to St. Joseph's orphanage and created the Don Bosco School for delinquent boys.

1950 to present 
On July 8, 1954, Pius XII appointed Reverend Robert Joyce as the first auxiliary bishop of Burlington.  When Ryan died in 1956,  Pius XII named Joyce as his replacement.  With Joyce's retirement in 1971, Pope Paul VI appointed Reverend John Marshall as the next bishop.

In March 1972, an arsonist burned the Cathedral of the Immaculate Conception. Marshall built a new cathedral with the same name on the same site in 1977. In 1974, Marshall closed St. Joseph's orphanage and eventually sold the property.  It is now a condominiun project known as 'Liberty House.'

In 1992, Pope John Paul II appointed Auxiliary Bishop Kenneth Angell from the Diocese of Providence as the new bishop of Burlington. Under Angell, Catholic schools in the diocese experienced a 24% drop in enrollment between 1998 and 2008, from 3,190 to 2,431 students. Faced with a shortage of priests in Burlington, and a decline in weekly mass attendance, Angell consolidated Sacred Heart and St. Francis de Sales Parishes in Bennington as well as St. Cecilia and St. Frances Cabrini in East Barre, and closed Our Lady of the Lake in St. Albans.

In 1999, the Vatican elevated Saint Joseph Church in Burlington as the co-cathedral of the diocese. Burlington became one of only four American dioceses to have two active cathedral churches in the same city. In March 2005, Pope John Paul II appointed Reverend Salvatore Matano from the Diocese of Providence as coadjutor bishop of the diocese.  When Agnell retired several months later, Matano automatically became the new bishop of Burlington. In 2010, Matano ordained four priests, the highest number in the diocese in decades.

On December 22, 2014, Pope Francis appointed Auxiliary Bishop Christopher J. Coyne from the Archdiocese of Indianapolis as the next diocesan bishop. He replaced Matano, who was appointed bishop of the Diocese of Rochester. Coyne's installation was celebrated on January 29, 2015, at the Co-Cathedral of Saint Joseph. On October 11, 2018, Coyne announced that the diocese was selling the Cathedral of the Immaculate Conception due to a long period of low attendance. Its members were transferred to St. Joseph's, which became the sole cathedral in the diocese.

Sexual abuse

In the 1990's, the Diocese of Burlington was sued by multiple former residents of St. Joseph's Orphanage, claiming abuse by the stallf. Managed by the Sisters of Providence, St. Joseph's had closed in 1974. Over 100 former residents stated that they had been physically, sexually and emotionally abused by nuns, priests and lay staff workers from the 1940's through the 1960's. These abuses included residents being tied to trees, whipped, locked in small boxes, raped, beaten, burned with cigarettes and matches, hung upside down outside windows and tossed into water to "sink or swim".  There were also allegations of murder.

Lawyers for the diocese originally asked the court to throw out the St. Joseph lawsuits, claiming that the victims' allegations could not be corroborated. Howevers. statements from four nuns and two priests who worked there weakened those arguments . Additionally, five out of eight priests at St. Joseph's were also accused by victims of sexual abuse in unrelated litigation. The accused priests were Fathers Foster, Bresnehan, Devoy, Emile Savary, and Donald LaRouche, who were posted at St. Joseph's over its 39 years of operation. The diocese utimately paid out over $300,000 to settle the claims of 60 former orphans.

In 2010, the Diocese of Burlington settled 26 lawsuits for sexual abuse by its clergy for $. In August 2019, the diocese released the names of 40 clergy since 1950 who had been "credibly accused" of sex abuse. Most of these men were deceased and none were in active ministry. Much of the abuse occurred at St Josephs, and all but one of these named acts took place before 2000.

Deaneries

There are twelve deaneries in the diocese.

 Addison
 Bennington
 Burlington
 Caledonia
 Capitol
 Franklin
 Orleans
 Rutland
 South Burlington
 Windham
 Windsor
 Winooski

Parishes

Bishops

Bishops of Burlington

 Louis de Goesbriand (1853–1899)
 John Stephen Michaud (1899–1908)
 Joseph John Rice (1910–1938)
 Matthew Francis Brady (1938–1944), appointed Bishop of Manchester
 Edward Francis Ryan (1944–1956)
 Robert Francis Joyce (1956–1971)
 John Aloysius Marshall (1971–1992), appointed Bishop of Springfield in Massachusetts
 Kenneth Anthony Angell (1992–2005)
 Salvatore Ronald Matano (2005–2014; coadjutor bishop 2005), appointed Bishop of Rochester
 Christopher J. Coyne (2015–present)

Auxiliary Bishop of Burlington
 Robert Francis Joyce (1954-1956), appointed Bishop of Burlington

Other diocesan priests who became bishops
 Bernard Flanagan, appointed Bishop of Norwich in 1953
 Louis Gelineau, appointed Bishop of Providence in 1971

Education
Lisa Lorenz is the superintendent of schools.

There are fifteen Catholic schools in Vermont.

4 secondary/high schools:
 Mount Saint Joseph Academy, Rutland
 Rice Memorial High School, South Burlington
 St. Michael's Catholic High School, Brattleboro
 St. Terese Digital Catholic Academy (online)

11 parochial/parish elementary/middle schools:
 St Monica St Michael School, formerly Central Vermont Catholic School (formerly St. Monica), Barre
 St. Paul's Catholic School, Barton
 Sacred Heart School, Bennington
 St. Michael School, Brattleboro
 Christ the King School, Burlington
 Mater Christi School (private), Burlington
 Bishop John A. Marshall (private), Morrisville
 Sacred Heart, Newport
 Christ the King School, Rutland
 Good Shepherd, St. Johnsbury
 St. Francis Xavier, Winooski

Student enrollment dropped 24% from 3,190 to 2,431 from 1999 to 2008.

Assets
In 2005, the Diocese of Burlington had net assets of $5,679,217. This figure includes assets acquired "at cost." An insurance company has estimated that it would cost $400 million to replace the physical assets of the diocese, including churches, schools, and nursing homes.

The Vermont Catholic Charities had total net assets of $3,874,935.

See also

 Catholic Church by country
 Catholic Church in the United States
 Ecclesiastical Province of Boston
 Global organisation of the Catholic Church
 List of Roman Catholic archdioceses (by country and continent)
 List of Roman Catholic dioceses (alphabetical) (including archdioceses)
 List of Roman Catholic dioceses (structured view) (including archdioceses)
 List of the Catholic dioceses of the United States

Notables
 In 1808 Fanny Allen, daughter of Revolutionary War General Ethan Allen, converted to the Catholic faith, and entered the novitiate of Hôtel-Dieu de Montréal, where she was received as a member of the order.
 Orestes Brownson, the noted Catholic author and philosopher, was a Vermont native. He was born in Stockbridge in 1803.

Footnotes

External links
 Roman Catholic Diocese of Burlington Official Site
 Vermont Catholic Tribune

 
Diocese of Burlington
Organizations based in Burlington, Vermont
Burlington
Burlington
Burlington
1853 establishments in Vermont